Ferdinand Budicki (11 April 1871 – 25 June 1951) was a Croatian pioneer of car, bicycle and airplane culture. A resident of Zagreb, Croatia, Budicki was reportedly the first to drive a car in his home city, and the first to open a car dealership and repair shop in Croatia. In April 1901, he drove from Vienna, Austria to Zagreb in an 1899 Opel, stirring up a commotion, as people and horses that drove carriages at the time were not used to motor vehicles, even though the car's top speed was, according to Budicki, a mere .

Early life
Ferdinand Budicki was born on 11 April 1871 in Zagreb to Marija (née Panian) and Ferdinand Budicki. His parents were renowned craftspeople.

Having completed two grades of Realschule, Budicki first trained for a locksmith, then studied mechanics abroad. He assembled his own bicycle while living in Vienna. He subsequently used it in 1897 to travel throughout Europe and northern Africa, reportedly traversing .

Career
In 1901, Budicki purchased a used car from Opel & Beyschlag in Vienna for 4,000 Austro-Hungarian crowns. Budicki was taught how to drive by Otto Beyschlag and received extra training in the form of observing an electric tram driver at work. He subsequently drove the car from Vienna to Zagreb. The following year, he travelled the same route on a Laurin & Klement motorcycle. This took him 13 hours and 45 minutes; his progress was reported live at Zagreb's Ban Jelačić Square.

Whether he was the first car driver in Zagreb is disputed, as an Obzor article states that Count Marko Bombelles from Varaždin drove to Zagreb in a Benz & Cie. car on 17 August 1899.

On 28 August 1901, Budicki received his driving licence in Vienna. In 1904, he started giving driving lessons. In 1910 Zagreb started to issue its own driving licences. Budicki's license was not recognised, so he took a driving examination on 27 July 1910 and received the licence with serial number 1. However, as none of the examination committee members knew how to drive, Budicki had to teach them before the examination. He subsequently opened Zagreb's first driving school. Budicki was also the first to receive a traffic ticket for speeding on 6 June 1901 in Mavrova Street (today Masaryk Street). In 1905 he flew a hot air balloon from Zagreb to nearby Gornja Stubica and Mraclin, while the next year he completed a successful flight from Zagreb to the Adriatic island of Krk.

Budicki entered the business of new vehicles by opening a bicycle and sewing machine shop called K touristu ("At the Tourist's") at Mavrova Street 24 in 1899. In the early 1900s, the shop began selling cars and motorcycles as well. On 1 June 1906, Budicki founded the first Croatian Automobile Society, which opened with 14 members. From 1910 to 1928 he was the general distributor for Ford in the Kingdom of Croatia-Slavonia. In 1929, he started a taxicab company and a bus line from Zagreb to Sv. Ivan Zelina. Later that year he had to exit the automobile business due to the stock market crash of 1929, retaining only a car repair shop.

Budicki died in Zagreb on 25 June 1951 at the age of 80.

Legacy
On 4 July 2013, the Ferdinand Budicki Automobile Museum was opened in Zagreb, honouring Budicki's pioneering legacy in its name. The  hosts Budicki's cycling medals.

In Zagreb, there is a Ferdinand Budicki Street in the neighbourhood of Staglišće.

References

Further reading

Croatian automotive pioneers
Aviation pioneers
Engineers from Zagreb
1871 births
1951 deaths
Burials at Mirogoj Cemetery
20th century in Zagreb